The 2025 Rugby League World Cup will be the seventeenth staging of the international rugby league tournament contested by the top national representative teams. 

The 2025 Rugby League World Cup may also refer to those featured in the 2025 Festival of World Cups;

 2025 Women's Rugby League World Cup, the 7th staging of the Women's Rugby League World Cup
 2025 Wheelchair Rugby League World Cup, the 5th staging of the Wheelchair Rugby League World Cup
 2025 Physical Disability Rugby League World Cup, the 2nd world cup for physical disability rugby league
 2025 Youth Rugby League World Cup

See also 
 Rugby (disambiguation)
 World cup of rugby (disambiguation)